These hits topped the Ultratop 50 in the Flanders region of Belgium in 1983.

See also
1983 in music

References

1983 in Belgium
1983 record charts
1983